Colin Mitchell (6 June 1914 – 29 August 1986) was an Australian rules footballer who played with Footscray and North Melbourne in the Victorian Football League (VFL).

Notes

External links 

1914 births
1986 deaths
Australian rules footballers from Melbourne
Western Bulldogs players
North Melbourne Football Club players
West Footscray Football Club players
People from Footscray, Victoria